Aleksandr or Alexander Petrov may refer to:

Alexander Petrov (chess player) (1794–1867), Russian chess master
Aleksandr Petrov (wrestler) (1876–1941), Russian wrestler at the 1908 Olympic Greco-Roman super heavyweight competition
Aleksandr Petrov (footballer, born 1893) (1893–1942), Russian international footballer
Aleksandr Petrov (footballer, born 1925) (1925–1972), Soviet international footballer
Aleksandr Petrov (basketball) (1939–2001), member of the silver-medal-winning Soviet Olympic basketball team in 1960 and 1964
Alexander G. Petrov (born 1948), Bulgarian professor in physics
Aleksandr Petrov (animator) (born 1957), Russian animator famous for using paint-on-glass animation
Alexander Petrovich Petrov (born 1958), Russian politician
Alexander Petrov (born 1979), Russian spy, military doctor

Aleksandr Petrov (footballer, born 1984), Russian footballer 
Aleksandr Petrov (long jumper) (born 1986), Russian athlete
Alexander Petrov (actor) (born 1989), Russian actor
Alexander Nikolayevich Petrov (born 1990), Russian footballer
Alexander Petrov (figure skater) (born 1999), Russian figure skater
Alexander Petrov (hacker), Russian hacker
Aleksander Petrov (runner), Bulgarian runner
Aleksander Petrov, character from the Australian soap opera Neighbours.